This is a list of members of the Tasmanian Legislative Council between 1939 and 1945. Terms of the Legislative Council did not coincide with Legislative Assembly elections, and members served six year terms, with a number of members facing election each year.

Elections

Members

Notes
  On 26 February 1942, John Cheek, the member for Westmorland, died. George Flowers won the resulting by-election on 5 May 1942.
  On 14 April 1943, Percy Best, the member for Meander, died. Elliot Lillico, the son of Alexander Lillico, won the resulting by-election.
  On 10 July 1943, Labor member Dr John Gaha, one of the three members for Hobart, resigned to successfully contest the federal seat of Denison at the 1943 election. Labor candidate Arthur Tyler won the resulting by-election on 14 September 1943 by a margin of three votes, and the unsuccessful candidate successfully petitioned the Supreme Court to void the election. Tyler won a second by-election on 22 January 1944 by a 211-vote margin against a different opponent.

Sources
 
 Parliament of Tasmania (2006). The Parliament of Tasmania from 1856

Members of Tasmanian parliaments by term
20th-century Australian politicians